Moriah Center is a hamlet in Essex County, New York, United States. Moriah Center has a post office with ZIP code 12961.

References

Hamlets in Essex County, New York
Hamlets in New York (state)